Summer of Fear is the second album by Miles Benjamin Anthony Robinson from Brooklyn, Oregon. After joining Saddle Creek Records on August 12, 2009, Summer Of Fear was released via the iTunes Store and Saddle Creek's Store on September 22, 2009. It was released in stores on October 20, 2009.

Track listing 
 "Shake a Shot" - 3:24
 "Always an Anchor" - 4:12
 "The Sound" - 5:32
 "Hard Row" - 3:28
 "Trap Door" - 4:05
 "The 100th of March" - 5:47
 "Gold and Grey" - 3:05
 "Summer of Fear Pt. 1" - 5:03
 "Death by Dust" - 4:37
 "Summer of Fear Pt. 2" - 5:29
 "Losing 4 Winners" - 3:40
 "More Than a Mess" -11:35
 "Boat" - 6:34

References

Miles Benjamin Anthony Robinson albums
2009 albums